The 2nd Cavalry Division (2-ya Kavaleriiskaya Diviziya) was a cavalry formation of the Russian Imperial Army.

In 1914, the division was headquartered at Suwałki, part of the 2nd Army Corps.

Organization
In 1914, the division included the following units:
1st Cavalry Brigade (Suwalki)
2nd Pskov Life Dragoon Regiment (Suwalki)
2nd Courland Life Uhlan Regiment (Kalwaria)
2nd Cavalry Brigade (Suwalki)
2nd Pavlograd Life Hussar Regiment (Suwalki)
2nd Don Cossack Regiment (Augustów)
2nd Horse Artillery Battalion (Suwalki)

Commanders (Division Chiefs) 
1884–1892: Feofil Egorovich Meindorf
1899–1901: Pavel Plehve
1905: Alexander Dubensky
1909: Afanasy Tsurikov
1914: Huseyn Khan Nakhchivanski

Chiefs of Staff
12/03/1876 - 07/19/1877 - Colonel Povalo-Shveikovsky, Alexander Nikolaevich
11/06/1877 - 05/21/1886 - Colonel Gek, Andrey Konstantinovich
03/26/1887 - 03/10/1889 - Colonel Schwemberger, Joseph Fedorovich
03/10/1889 - 04/15/1890 - Colonel Avramov, Vladimir Alexandrovich
04/19/1890 - 01/07/1891 - Colonel Litvinov, Alexander Ivanovich
01/07/1891 - 02/27/1891 - Colonel Mikhailov, Nikolai Grigorievich
February 27, 1891 - December 20, 1892 - Colonel Nikolai Bobyr
01/26, 1893 - 11/20, 1895 - Colonel Popov, Ivan Vasilievich
11/27, 1895 - 02/29, 1896 - Colonel Ugryumov, Andrei Alexandrovich
03/18, 1896 - 08/17, 1896 - Colonel Eichgolts, Alexander Rudolfovich
09/04, 1896 - March 27, 1898 - Colonel Vladimir Apollonovich Olokhov
03/27, 1898 - 02/25, 1899 - Colonel Nekrasov
03/20, 1899 - 06/04, 1902 - Colonel Prince Begildeev, Konstantin Sergeevich
July 20, 1902 - October 19, 1904 - Colonel Nikolai Volodchenko
December 30, 1904 - February 23, 1907 - Colonel Johnson, Herbert Georgievich
03/12/1907 - 07/23/1908 - Colonel ND Polivanov
08/02/1908 - 10/13/1908 - Colonel Fedotov, Alexander Ippolitovich
10.21.1908—09.07.1912 - Colonel Sencha, Vladimir Ivanovich
07/11/1912 - 03/25/1913 - Colonel Stepanov, Nikolai Alexandrovich
03/25/1913 - 08/22/1914 - Colonel Chesnakov, Pyotr Vladimirovich
08/22/1914 - 12/02/1915 - Wreed Colonel Gotovsky, Vladimir Nikolaevich
01/15/1916 - 01/18/1917 - Colonel Chesnakov, Pyotr Vladimirovich
04/02/1917 - 05/12/1917 - Major General of the General Staff Goncharenko, Georgy Ivanovich

Commanders of the 1st Brigade
1905: Nikolai Papa-Afanasopulo
April-August 1908: Gleb Vannovsky
1909: Evgeny Leontovich

Commanders of the 2nd Brigade
1887: Nikolai Fedorovich Ilyin
1905: Mikhail Pleshkov
1909: Nikolai Leo

References

Cavalry divisions of the Russian Empire
Military units and formations disestablished in 1918